The National Initiative Party was a small Romanian political party. It emerged after three Democratic Party (PD) MCDs were expelled form the party a few days after the Justice and Truth Alliance (DA) narrowly won the 2004 legislative election. The three members are: Cosmin Gușă, Lavinia Șandru, and Aurelian Pavelescu. The party merged into UNPR in December 2011.

Its founding members were political analyst (Cosmin Gușă), member of UNPR (Lavinia Șandru), and had a dispute over the PNȚCD leadership (currently still held by Aurelian Pavelescu).

Electoral history

European elections

References 

Conservative parties in Romania